The Bois d'Orange River is a river in Gros Islet Quarter, Saint Lucia that flows into the Caribbean Sea.

See also
List of rivers of Saint Lucia

References

Rivers of Saint Lucia